Lacrimosa is a Swiss rock duo led by German Tilo Wolff, the main composer, and Finn Anne Nurmi. They are currently based in Switzerland, but originally from Germany. Originally counted among the bands of the Neue Deutsche Todeskunst genre, Lacrimosa are most associated with the gothic metal and symphonic metal genres.

Their musical style mixes gothic rock and heavy metal, along with violin, trumpet, and more classical instruments, although their musical development throughout the years has also led to changes in instrumentation. Lacrimosa's lyrics are written almost exclusively in German, although since the 1995 album Inferno every album has featured one or two songs in English, generally written by Anne Nurmi. Finnish has also appeared in the spoken intro to two songs ("Schakal" on Inferno and "The Turning Point" on Elodia) and on a bonus track in a limited edition release of Fassade called Vankina. Their lyrics are mainly about loneliness, sadness, darkness, despair, and love.

The band has sold more than 20,000 copies of each album in Germany, but has also gained a large fanbase in Russia, Mexico and China.

Brief timeline

 1990: Tilo Wolff releases a tape called Clamor using the band name of Lacrimosa.
 1991: Tilo Wolff founds a new record company called Hall of Sermon, as an independent label to publish Lacrimosa's records.
 1993: Anne Nurmi joins the solo project to play keyboard, becoming a permanent member soon after.

Musical and thematic development

Lacrimosa's first album, Angst, is a very gloomy piece of slow, rather minimal music, dominated by keyboards and a depressed, sometimes frantic and insane, voice. In this early period, the themes explored through lyrics and music are of a very bleak nature, such as fear; helplessness; loneliness; the non-existence, unattainability or illusionary nature of love; and death. The same thematic preoccupations can be found on the next three albums, Einsamkeit, Satura and Inferno, but now and then a more positive note begins to sound in the dismal tapestry. Musically, this period is characterised by the introduction of electric guitars and basses, with more and more rock elements being added to the slow, keyboard-based music of the earliest album.

With Stille, Lacrimosa releases an album that might easily be classified as 'metal', a style which they'll keep using for their own purposes from then on. Heavy guitars supplemented by more bombastic arrangements for classical instruments have come to dominate the music, showing a close affinity to symphonic metal. Thematically, the emphasis on the darker side of human emotions is lowered if not abandoned, with Stille featuring several uplifting songs. "Stolzes Herz" ("Proud heart") and "Die Strasse der Zeit" ("The Lane of Time") especially sing the praise of individual and cultural strength respectively. "Die Strasse der Zeit" describes a journey backwards through a history ravaged by war, greed and stupidity, until the protagonist finds solace in the youthful hope and strength of ancient Greek culture - an image which reminds one more of Nietzsche than of the depressed songs on Angst.
 
The next album, Elodia, reduces the role of metal-style guitars and increases that of symphonic, classical arrangements, this time recorded in part by the London Symphony Orchestra. Presented as a play in three parts, Elodia revolves around the theme of love. The gothic element is still present, though, and the themes of loss and death feature prominently in the latter half of the 'play', which nevertheless ends with an affirmation of hope.

The musical style of Elodia is still evident on the 2001 album Fassade, which features a wide variety of musical visions, from the harsh metal sound of "Liebesspiel" ("Love Game") to gently flowing keyboards of "Senses", to the symphonic interplay between guitars and orchestra on the title song "Fassade". This latter composition, a piece in three movements which are arranged on the album as tracks 1, 5 and 8, also constitutes a new thematic excursion of Lacrimosa as they move from the personal emotions they normally explore to a critique of modern society. It ends, however, with the affirmation of individuality and the protagonist's retreat from society.

Echos bears witness to a further musical development, as guitars and other rock elements take centre stage less and less often, whereas classical instruments feature more prominently. The orchestral arrangements move away from the standard symphonic arrangements which are often found in contemporary metal music, as is clearly shown by the album's first track, the long orchestral "Kyrie - Overture". The music on Echos also shows an influence from electronic and industrial music, as is especially obvious in the song "Ein Hauch von Menschlichkeit" ("A Touch of Humanity"). Overall, this album is more personal, more 'classical' and more quiet than those that came before it. Thematically, there is less change as Lacrimosa continues to explore love and its associated emotions with gothic twists.

Lacrimosa's ninth album, Lichtgestalt, largely retains the classical orientation of Echos, but rock elements begin to resurface. In particular the first track, Sapphire, begins as a slow, mostly classical song but around halfway through moves into a far more metal-sounding section; the pace of the song increases, a heavy guitar backing takes over and Wolff switches from singing into a rasping, high-pitched death grunt for a few minutes. The segment is a significant change of direction for Lacrimosa; this vocal style had not been seen in Lacrimosa songs since Copycat on the 1995 album Inferno, recorded ten years before. The remaining songs display a similar mix of styles to previous albums, with some upbeat songs, a song written and sung in English mainly by Anne Nurmi (though Wolff duets with her on this track) and some slower-paced, more depressing pieces.

In 2005, a new EP, "Lichtgestalten" is released, that brings a new electronic version of the song "Lichtgestalt", produced by Tilo in the scope of his solo project, Snakeskin.
 
In 2006, a DVD Musikkurzfilme is released, which contains all the video clips that Lacrimosa shot throughout its career including the video for the "Lichtgestalt" song.

Sehnsucht, the latest album is released in 2009. Singer and producer Tilo Wolff wanted to create an album that was less conceptual and more spontaneous than the previous releases by Lacrimosa and so Sehnsucht features a great variability of musical expressions like a sarcastic track "Feuer" and a smooth song "Call Me With The Voice Of Love".

The main musical development of Lacrimosa might be summarised as follows: starting from the minimal, slow, keyboard driven style of Angst, guitars and other metal influences came to play a more and more prominent role, until they reached a peak on Stille. From then on, the emphasis has shifted from guitars and metal to symphonic and classical writing, which is clearly shown in Fassade. Finally, Echos takes a turn towards the personal and away from the symphonic and heavy aspects of the previous albums, achieving a quite unique mixture of musical elements which is hard to classify. The pace of Lacrimosa's development is slow enough that each album is recognisably linked to its predecessor and successor, yet fast enough that for instance Angst, Stille and Echoes might well have been written by completely different bands.

In 2008 the Lacrimosa-run Hall of Sermon label reclaimed the rights on all the band's Nuclear Blast releases. Unavailable for quite some time, two albums and two singles will be re-released. In March 2008 Lacrimosa started working on their next studio album entitled "Sehnsucht", which was released on 8 May 2009.

An eleventh studio album was released in September 2012, and it was called Revolution. The first song of this release was written in 2009 while touring in China. Upon returning to his studio, Tilo Wolff began recording, exemplifying his process of recording music in the moment in which it is written.

In 2015 Hoffnung was released, followed 2017 by Testimonium which is meant as a commemorative album for such recently passed away musicians like David Bowie and Prince. The band's latest album is scheduled for 24 December 2021 with the title Leidenschaft (i.e. "Passion").

Members
Tilo Wolff – vocals, programming, piano, keyboards, music production, arrangements (1990-present)
Anne Nurmi – vocals, keyboards (1993-present)

Discography
All albums and DVDs were published by Tilo Wolff's own label, Hall of Sermon.

Albums

Live albums

Compilation albums

Singles

Demos and extended plays

Videography

VHS

DVD

References

External links 

 
 Snakeskin, a side project of Tilo Wolff
 Interview with Tilo Wolff "Emotional Concept" June 4, 2010
 
 

German dark wave musical groups
German gothic metal musical groups
German symphonic metal musical groups
German musical duos
Musical groups established in 1990
Neue Deutsche Todeskunst groups
Nuclear Blast artists